Fuzhou or Fu Prefecture was a zhou (prefecture) in imperial China, centering on modern Xiantao, Hubei, China. It existed (intermittently) from mid-6th century until 1278. Between 1275 and 1278 during the Yuan dynasty it was known as Fuzhou Route.

Geography
The administrative region of Fuzhou in the Tang dynasty is in modern southern Hubei. It probably includes parts of modern: 
Xiantao
Tianmen
Under the administration of Jingzhou:
Honghu
Jianli County

References
 

Prefectures of the Sui dynasty
Prefectures of the Tang dynasty
Prefectures of Later Liang (Five Dynasties)
Prefectures of Later Jin (Five Dynasties)
Prefectures of Later Han (Five Dynasties)
Prefectures of Later Tang
Prefectures of Later Zhou
Prefectures of the Song dynasty
Prefectures of the Yuan dynasty
Former prefectures in Hubei